Phi Beta Sigma (ΦΒΣ) is an international historically Black fraternity. Founded on January 9, 1914, on the campus of Howard University in Washington, D.C., Phi Beta Sigma has chartered chapters at other colleges, universities, and cities, and named them with Greek-letters. The fraternity's expansion started with its second (Beta) and third (Gamma) chapters, chartered at Wiley College and Morgan State University respectively in 1915. Today, the fraternity serves through a membership of more than 200,000 men in over 700 chapters in the United States, Europe, Asia, and the Caribbean. The following list includes both active and inactive chapters throughout the world.

The fraternity has reserved the designation Omega chapter as a memorial to those brothers who are deceased.
Alumni chapters are indicated by Sigma at the end of their chapter name.

Regions

Phi Beta Sigma Fraternity organizes its chapters according to their regions in the United States and abroad. The seven regions are each led by a regional director and a regional board. A comprehensive list of regions is shown below:

 Eastern (Connecticut, Delaware, District of Columbia, Maine, Maryland, Massachusetts, New Hampshire, New Jersey, New York, Pennsylvania, Rhode Island, Vermont, Virginia, West Virginia, the United States Virgin Islands, Africa, and Europe)
 Great Lakes (Illinois, Indiana, Iowa, Kentucky, Michigan, Minnesota, Ohio, and Wisconsin)
 Gulf Coast (Louisiana, New Mexico and Texas)

 Southeastern (North Carolina, South Carolina and all of Tennessee east of the 86th Longitude)
 Southern (Alabama, Bahamas, Florida, Georgia, and Mississippi)
 Southwestern (Arkansas, Kansas, Missouri, Nebraska, Oklahoma and all of Tennessee west of the 86th Longitude)
 Western (Alaska, Arizona, California, Colorado, Hawaii, Idaho, Montana, Nevada, North Dakota, Oregon, South Dakota, Utah, Washington, Wyoming and Asia)

Eastern
The states that make up the Eastern Region are: Connecticut, Delaware, District of Columbia, Maine, Maryland, Massachusetts, New Hampshire, New Jersey, New York, Pennsylvania, Rhode Island, Vermont, Virginia, West Virginia. In addition to these 14 states, chapters within the United States Virgin Islands, Africa, and Europe are included.

Collegiate chapters
FratChapterStart

Alumni chapters

Great Lakes
The states that make up the Great Lakes Region are: Illinois, Indiana, Iowa, Kentucky, Michigan, Minnesota, Ohio and Wisconsin.

Collegiate chapters

Alumni chapters

Gulf Coast
The states that make up the Gulf Coast Region are: Louisiana, New Mexico and Texas.

Collegiate chapters

Alumni chapters

Southeastern
The States that make up the Southeastern Region are: North Carolina, South Carolina and all of Tennessee east of the 86th Longitude.

Collegiate chapters

Alumni chapters

Southern
The states that make up the Southern Region are: Alabama, Florida, Georgia, and Mississippi. In addition to those four states, all chapters in the country of the Bahamas are included in this region.

Collegiate chapters

Alumni chapters

Pi Upsilon Sigma | Live To Serve, Serve To Live

Southwestern
The states that make up the Southwestern Region are: Arkansas, Kansas, Missouri, Nebraska, Oklahoma and all of Tennessee west of the 86th Longitude.

Collegiate chapters

Alumni chapters

Western
The Western region, with 15 states, holds the largest number of states within a region in Phi Beta Sigma Fraternity. The states that make up the Western Region are: Alaska, Arizona, California, Colorado, Hawaii, Idaho, Montana, Nevada, North Dakota, Oregon, South Dakota, Utah, Washington, Wyoming. In addition to these states, all chapters within the continent of Asia are in this region.

Collegiate chapters

Alumni chapters

References

Zeta Upsilon Chapter, founded in 1975 by Stephen McDaniel, was the first fraternity on the campus of UMBC.

Chapters
Lists of chapters of United States student societies by society